St. Stephan  is a former cemetery church of the old South Cemetery in Munich, southern Germany.

The church is located at the northern end of the Southern Cemetery, directly to Stephan Street, near the Sendlinger Tor Place. It is the chapel of the parish church of St Peter.

St. Stephan's church is an early Baroque building, oriented eastwards, and constructed from 1674 to 1677 by George Zwerger.

References

External links 

 Photo spread of St Stephan's Church, Munich

Stephan
Baroque architecture in Munich
1677 establishments in the Holy Roman Empire
Cultural heritage monuments in Munich